Antoinette Miggiani (born 5 September 1937) is a Maltese operatic soprano and singing teacher.

Biography
Antoinette Miggiani was born in Sliema, Malta. After studying piano and voice in her native country, she won a British Council scholarship to study at London's Royal Academy of Music in 1958. She was under contract to the Royal Opera House, Covent Garden for the 1961/62 seasons following her First Prize award at the Royal Liverpool Philharmonic Society International Singers' Competition. During the 1960s, she sang in London, France, Germany, and Italy (where she gave several recitals for Italian Radio). She returned several times to Malta where she sang at the Teatru Manoel as Leonora in La forza del destino (1963) and  Santuzza in Cavalleria rusticana (1965), as well as a Royal Gala Performance at the theatre for Queen Elizabeth II and Prince Philip (1967). In 1968 she undertook a tour of the United States, where she sang both in recital and on the opera stage, including performances as Maddalena in Andrea Chénier at Seattle Opera with Franco Corelli in the title role.

Her international career was cut short in 1970, when her parents became ill and she returned permanently to Malta to care for them. However, she continued to sing in Malta in lieder recitals and concerts, and as a soloist in performances of sacred music, including the Verdi, Mozart, Elgar, and Rossini Requiems; Antonín Dvořák's Stabat Mater; and Gounod's Messe solennelle Sainte-Cécile. She also sang in operas at the Teatru Manoel, including the title role of Carmelo Pace's Ipogeana in its 1976 world premiere. For many years Miggiani has been a distinguished voice teacher in Malta. Amongst her former pupils are the soprano Lydia Caruana and baritone Lino Attard. On 13 December 1991, she was awarded her country's Medal for Service to the Republic (Midalja għall-Qadi tar-Repubblika).

References

1937 births
Living people
Alumni of the Royal Academy of Music
20th-century Maltese women singers
20th-century Maltese singers
Maltese operatic sopranos
Voice teachers
20th-century women opera singers
Women music educators
Maltese women